The longfins, also known as roundheads or spiny basslets, are a family, Plesiopidae, which were formerly placed in the order Perciformes but are now regarded as being incertae sedis in the subseries Ovalentaria in the clade Percomorpha. They are elongated fishes, found in the Indian Ocean and western Pacific Ocean.

Classification
 
[[Image:Paraplesiops bleekeri 1.jpg|thumb|Eastern blue devil, Paraplesiops bleekeri]]

In some classifications, the genus Notograptus is split in its own family, Notograptidae, but FishBase is followed here. There are two subfamilies within the Plesiopidae and the genera are as follows:

Subfamily Acanthoclininae Günther, 1861
 Genus Acanthoclinus Jenyns, 1841    
 Genus Acanthoplesiops Regan, 1912    
 Genus Beliops Hardy, 1985    
 Genus Belonepterygion McCulloch, 1915  
 Genus Notograptus Günther, 1867  
 Subfamily Plesiopinae Günther, 1861
 Genus Assessor Whitley, 1935    
 Genus Calloplesiops Fowler and Bean, 1930    
 Genus Fraudella Whitley, 1935    
 Genus Paraplesiops Bleeker, 1875    
 Genus Plesiops Oken, 1817    
 Genus Steeneichthys Gerald R. Allen and Randall, 1985    
 Genus Trachinops'' Günther, 1861

References

 
 

 
Ovalentaria
Taxa named by Albert Günther